

The Lioré et Olivier LeO H-180 was a 1920s French two-seat flying-boat built by Lioré et Olivier.

Development
The H-180 first flew in 1928 and was a cantilever high-wing monoplane flying-boat. Powered by a 120 hp (89 kW) Salmson 9Ac engine strut-mounted above the fuselage. It had two side-by-side seats in an open cockpit but the following year it was fitted with an enclosed cockpit and re-designated the LeO H-181. The company intended to build a production batch of ten aircraft but only five H-181s were built. One aircraft was destroyed and the others finding no buyers were used as test aircraft by the company.

Variants
H-180Two-seat touring / training flying boat; 1 built.
H-181An enclosed cockpit version, with increased span and longer fuselage; 5 built.

Specifications (H-180)

See also

References

Flying boats
1920s French civil utility aircraft
H-180
Single-engined pusher aircraft
High-wing aircraft
Engine-over-wing aircraft
Aircraft first flown in 1928